Calculating God is a 2000 science fiction novel by Canadian writer Robert J. Sawyer.  It takes place in the present day and describes the arrival on Earth of sentient aliens. The bulk of the novel covers the many discussions and arguments on this topic, as well as about the nature of belief, religion, and science.  Several planetary civilizations  illustrate the logical conclusion of  the Fermi paradox.

Calculating God received nominations for both the Hugo and John W. Campbell Memorial Awards in 2001.

Plot summary
Thomas Jericho, a paleontologist working at the Royal Ontario Museum in Toronto, Canada makes the first human-to-alien contact when a "Forhilnor", a spider-like alien from the third planet of the Beta Hydri system arrives on Earth to investigate Earth's evolutionary history. The alien, Hollus, has come to Earth to gain access to the museum's large collection of fossils, and to study accumulated human knowledge in order to gather evidence of the existence of God. It appears that Earth and Hollus' home planet, and the home planet of another alien species traveling with Hollus, all experienced the same five cataclysmic events at roughly the same time. Hollus believes that the universe was created by a god, to provide a place where life could develop and evolve. Thomas Jericho is an atheist who provides a balance to the philosophical discussion regarding the existence of gods.

At the end, the star Betelgeuse goes supernova, threatening all life within hundreds of light-years with radiation.  One of several dead civilizations discovered by the explorers may have deliberately induced the supernova in order to sterilize the stellar neighborhood. This was presumably done in order to protect the virtual reality machinery which now housed all of their planet's personalities. According to a theory of Thomas's, several worlds exist where the inhabitants uploaded themselves into machines instead of exploring the nature of the universe and gods.

Although the supernova explosion occurred over 400 years before the events of the novel, the radiation is first reaching Earth at the present time due to its distance from Earth. However, the alien ship's advanced telescope in orbit then sees a large black entity emerge from space itself and cover the exploding star.  This is final proof that a controlling intelligence is guiding and preserving some life-forms in the universe.

In the final chapter, the scientist, who is dying of cancer, travels to the entity on the alien ship, where a fusion of genetic materials from human and alien sources produces a new life form that the aliens conjecture will create the next cycles of the universe.

Notes

References
Cassada, Jackie. "Calculating God (Book review)." Library Journal 125.7 (15 Apr. 2000): 126.
Flynn, Tom. "SCIENCE FICTION GOES ANTHROPIC." Free Inquiry 22.1 (Winter2001/2002 2001): 62.
"Forecasts: Fiction." Publishers Weekly 247.12 (20 Mar. 2000): 75.
Johnson, Roberta. "Adult Books: FICTION." Booklist 96.16 (15 Apr. 2000): 1534.
Seidman, Barry F. "Using Science Fiction to Promote Creationism." Skeptical Inquirer 26.2 (Mar. 2002): 53–54.
 Elmore, Jonathan. Fiction and the Sixth Mass Extinction: Narrative in an Era of Loss. Chapter 8.  (Google Books).

See also
 Fermi paradox

External links
 
 Calculating God on sfwriter.com
 Calculating God at Worlds Without End

2000 science fiction novels
Fiction set around Beta Hydri
Fiction set around Betelgeuse
Novels by Robert J. Sawyer
Novels set in Toronto
Religion in science fiction
Fiction about supernovae
Tor Books books